The 2023 La Vuelta Femenina, (officially La Vuelta Femenina by Carrefour.es), will be the first edition of the La Vuelta Femenina, a cycling stage race taking place in Spain. The race is scheduled for 1 to 7 May 2023, part of the UCI Women's World Tour.

La Vuelta Femenina replaces the stage race (previously one day race) Challenge by La Vuelta, staged at the same time as the men's tour.

Route and stages 
In February 2023, the route was announced by race director Fernando Escartín, who also confirmed that the race will be sponsored by supermarket Carrefour. 

The race will start in Torrevieja on the Costa Blanca with a team time trial, before heading north with stages through Castilla–La Mancha, Community of Madrid and Castile and León. The final two stages take place in Cantabria and Asturias, with a decisive final climb up the Lagos de Covadonga, a  ascent with an average gradient of 7.4%. 

The previous Challenge by La Vuelta events had been criticised by the women's peloton for not being challenging enough. 3 time Giro Donne winner and 2022 Tour de France Femmes winner Annemiek van Vleuten praised the 2023 route, calling it "a very complete Vuelta", and welcomed that the inclusion of the Lagos de Covadonga climb on the final stage, stating "to end in such a famous location is essential for the race".

Teams 
12 UCI Women's WorldTeams were automatically invited, joined by 12 UCI Women's Continental Teams (9 of them from Spain). The teams were announced on 3 March 2023. 

UCI Women's WorldTeams

 
 
 
 
 
 
 
 
 
 
 
 

UCI Women's Continental Team

 
  
   
  (Eneicat-CMTeam-Seguros Deportivos)
  (Farto-BTC Women's Cycling Team)
  
  (Massi Tactic Women's Team) 
  (Soltec Team)

References

External links 

 Official website

Vuelta
La Vuelta Femenina 2023
La Vuelta Femenina
2023 in Spanish sport
La Vuelta Femenina
2023 Vuelta a España